Garcinia echinocarpa is a species of small to medium tree in the family Clusiaceae.

References

The Plant List
The Plant Note

echinocarpa